Marshall Junction is an unincorporated community in Saline County, Missouri, United States.

References

Unincorporated communities in Saline County, Missouri
Unincorporated communities in Missouri